Carbonea assentiens is a species of lichen belonging to the family Lecanoraceae. It is found in Antarctica and in the islands of the subantarctic.

It is parasitized by the lichenicolous fungi species Carbonea austroshetlandica and Muellerella pygmaea.

References

Lecanoraceae
Lichen species
Lichens described in 1873
Lichens of Antarctica
Taxa named by William Nylander (botanist)